Microcosm Publishing is an independent publisher and distributor based in Portland, Oregon. Microcosm describes itself as having "a reputation for teaching self-empowerment, showing hidden histories, and fostering creativity through challenging conventional publishing wisdom, influencing other publishers large and small with books and bookettes about DIY skills, food, zines, and art."

History
Beginning in 1996 with only Joe Biel, an autistic, self-taught teenager, doing part-time mail order out of a bedroom in Cleveland, Ohio, Microcosm moved to Portland, Oregon in 1998. Microcosm Publishing was originally run partly as a record label, which continues to inform its approach to bookselling. Microcosm released records by The Taxpayers, Flotation Walls, Bedford, Organic, Cripple Kid, The Unknown, The Roswells, Little Dipper, Rock, Star. The operation grew significantly over the first six years, was picked up for distribution by National Book Network in 2002 when Microcosm shifted focus to primarily becoming a book publisher. Microcosm is the publisher of such notable authors as Dr. Faith G Harper (Unf#ck Your Brain), Friday Gladheart (The Practical Witch's Almanac), Raleigh Briggs (Make Your Place), and Danny Caine (How to Resist Amazon and Why).
 
In 2006, the Utne Reader described Microcosm as an "esteemed Portland, Oregon-based publisher and distributor of zines, books, pamphlets, DVDs, and other fun stuff." Microcosm is known for works about DIY lifestyles, 1970s aesthetics of instructional books for self-empowerment, a tongue-in- cheek sense of humor, and images and artwork celebrating bicycles and radical politics. Many of the items offered are not available easily elsewhere on the web or otherwise.

Microcosm is also known for incorporating the tactics of early punk record labels, a DIY approach,  and guerrilla-style tactics for promoting their titles. Microcosm is now worker-owned and continues to operate as a non-profit, dividing all money beyond production expenses into the wages of all staff to maintain living wages in Portland, Oregon for its staff. Microcosm claims to have double the industry standard in the number of authors who are women.

In September 2008, Microcosm opened a new retail store in the Buckman neighborhood of southeast Portland. There was a noticeable shift in the type of reading material offered, since most stock is "hurts" and "remainders" sold at half retail price or less. In January 2014 the store grew for a fourth time, moving to a new location on Williams Avenue in Portland, a few blocks from its former longtime location in Liberty Hall.

Starting in 2006, before signing distribution deals with Independent Publisher's Group and later Publisher's Group West, Microcosm was taken over by new management who struggled to find affordable warehousing for the volume of publishing it was now doing inside inner-Portland. Unable to do so, it opened a mailorder warehouse in Bloomington, Indiana in March 2007. However, because of complications of managing across state lines, management closed this location in July 2011 and a new location replaced it in Lansing, Kansas. Soon thereafter, Lansing staffer Jessie Duke, an employee since 2006, became co-owner and the sole manager of Microcosm. In August 2012, run into the ground by tremendous amounts of accumulated debt, the organization agreed to split Duke's company into Pioneers Press, a separate businesses: that has since also closed; and Microcosm Publishing, run by founder Joe Biel, which bounced back and grew over 1200% over the next ten years. 

On December 12, 2014 Microcosm merged with Taking the Lane Omnimedia and Elly Blue Publishing to strengthen their respective catalogs with more feminist bicycling titles and added Elly Blue as co-owner and marketing director.

Microcosm grew considerably once all operations were consolidated back in Oregon. After paying off the remaining debts from former management, Microcosm was finally able to purchase a former Black credit union building a few blocks from its former location and a separate warehouse in Cleveland, Ohio 
, where Microcosm was founded, incorporating several staff that were involved in the 1990s. Over the next ten years sales increased by over 1289% and wages were increased by 987%. In 2019, Microcosm resumed distributing its own books from its own buildings and over the next three years sales increased by 224%.

References

Bibliography

External links
Microcosm Publishing

Small press publishing companies
Book publishing companies based in Oregon
Companies based in Portland, Oregon
Privately held companies based in Oregon
Publishing companies established in 1996
1996 establishments in Ohio